Big O Tires, LLC. is one of North America's largest retail tire franchisors, with more than 450 independently owned and operated locations extending through 23 states primarily in the Western and Midwestern United States. It is headquartered in Palm Beach Gardens, Florida and is a wholly owned subsidiary of TBC Corporation.

Big O private brand tires and other leading brands are available at all 450+ locations. In addition to selling and servicing tires, wheels, and alignments, Big O Tires provides routine maintenance and replacement services including, but not limited to: oil and filter changes, batteries, brakes, suspension and steering services.

History

The company was founded in 1962, when it split from OK Tires, it was headquartered in Englewood Colorado. In 1996, it was acquired by TBC Corporation, which also owns Tire Kingdom and NTB. In 2006, TBC was acquired by Sumitomo Corporation of Americas. In 2018, Michelin North America Inc. (MNAI) and Sumitomo Corporation of Americas (SCOA) announced a definitive agreement to combine their respective North American replacement tire distribution and related service operations in a 50–50 joint venture. Big O Tires remains a wholly owned subsidiary of TBC Corporation. 

In a landmark case in 1977, Big O Tires was awarded $19.6 million from Goodyear over Goodyear's use of the name "bigfoot" tires. The amount equaled 25% of Goodyear's advertising budget in the states where Big O operated. The amount was reduced on appeal and the case was later settled.

Services Offered 

 Nationwide service warranty protection 
 Quality service from ASE certified technicians 
 Tire Service & Repair 
 Oil, Lube & Filter 
 Routine Maintenance Services 
 Batteries 
 Brakes 
 Alignment 
 Suspension & Steering

References

External links
Company website

TBC Corporation
American companies established in 1962
Retail companies established in 1962
1996 mergers and acquisitions
Automotive part retailers of the United States
Automotive repair shops of the United States
Companies based in Palm Beach County, Florida